The Ivan Sandrof Lifetime Achievement Award, established in 1981, is an annual literary award presented by the National Book Critics Circle in honor of its first president, Ivan Sandrof. The award "is given to a person or institution who has, over time, made significant contributions to book culture." The Sandrof Award has also been presented as the "Ivan Sandrof Award for Lifetime Achievement in Publishing" and the "Ivan Sandrof Award, Contribution to American Arts & Letters."

Recipients

See also 
 John Leonard Prize
 National Book Critics Circle Awards
 National Book Critics Circle Award for Biography
 National Book Critics Circle Award for Criticism
 National Book Critics Circle Award for Fiction
 National Book Critics Circle Award for Memoir and Autobiography
 National Book Critics Circle Award for Nonfiction
 National Book Critics Circle Award for Poetry
 Nona Balakian Citation for Excellence in Reviewing

References

External links 

 Official website

Awards established in 1981
American literary awards
20th-century literary awards
21st-century literary awards
Lifetime achievement awards